Pei is a town in Mainling County, Tibet Autonomous Region. The town is situated on the only road from Mainling to Mêdog, near the entrance to the Yarlung Tsangpo Grand Canyon. The population was 1,771 (2000).

See also
List of towns and villages in Tibet

Populated places in Tibet